Michele Monti (5 June 1970 – 8 December 2018) was an Italian judoka. He died on 8 December 2018, aged 48.

Achievements

References

External links
 
 
 

1970 births
2018 deaths
Italian male judoka
Judoka at the 2000 Summer Olympics
Judoka at the 2004 Summer Olympics
Olympic judoka of Italy
Mediterranean Games gold medalists for Italy
Mediterranean Games bronze medalists for Italy
Mediterranean Games medalists in judo
Competitors at the 1997 Mediterranean Games
Competitors at the 2001 Mediterranean Games
20th-century Italian people
21st-century Italian people